Nellayi is a village in Kerala, India, located  towards south of Thrissur. National Highway 544 (NH 544) passes through the village.
Nellayi also has a railway station and place where station situated is at  Pongotra, which is 1.5 kms from Highway(Nellayi-irinjalakuda road) and a Vyloor Shiva temple, Vyloor Nellayi. The village was mentioned in the Malayalam movie Passenger.

Nellayi was an assembly seat in old country Kochi. The assembly seat comes under Pudukkad constituency. Nellayi is a part of parpukkara grama Panchayat.

References

Villages in Mukundapuram Taluk
Villages in Thrissur district